DXCM (1089 AM) is a radio station owned and operated by UM Broadcasting Network. The station's studio and transmitter are located at Ela Bldg., Quezon Blvd., Kidapawan.

It was originally broadcasting from Cotabato City until 2016, when it transferred to Kidapawan. By that time, it also established its FM relay station. From 2000 to June 14, 2020, the Radyo Ukay branding was used. On June 15, 2020, management decided to retire the branding as it has run its course. DXCM, along with its other AM stations, started carrying their perspective call letters in their brandings. The yellow highlighted in the "X" of their logos means to move forward.

References

Radio stations established in 1970
Radio stations in Cotabato